Gilbertiodendron splendidum is a tall forest tree of lowland swamp forests of coastal West Africa in the family Fabaceae.  It is found in Upper Guinean forests along coastal regions of Côte d'Ivoire, Ghana, and Sierra Leone.  It is threatened by habitat loss.

References

splendidum
Flora of Ivory Coast
Flora of Ghana
Flora of Sierra Leone
Trees of Africa
Vulnerable flora of Africa
Taxonomy articles created by Polbot